Nathan Daschle is the President & COO of The Daschle Group, a Public Policy Advisory of Baker Donelson. He was previously the Executive Vice President for Political Strategy at Clear Channel Media and Entertainment, where he ran a business unit dedicated to political advertising.

Daschle is also the founder and CEO of Ruck.us, which provides a digital toolkit for political candidates.

Early life and education
Nathan Daschle was born December 10, 1973, in Washington D.C. to then-U.S. Representative Tom Daschle and Laurie S. Fulton, later the United States Ambassador to Denmark. Daschle received his B.A., with distinction, from Northwestern University in 1995 and his J.D.cum laude, from Harvard Law School in 2002.

Career
From 2007 to 2010, Daschle was the executive director of the Democratic Governors Association (DGA), where he managed a $50 million annual budget and staff of over 20.  Over the four-year period in which he led DGA, the organization set fundraising records and won a majority of its targeted races. Daschle previously served as DGA's Counsel and Director of Policy and before this, he was a litigation associate at Covington and Burling in Washington, D.C.  Daschle has served in the legislative affairs office of the American Federation of State, County, and Municipal Employees and the Natural Resources Defense Council. He also worked on the 1996 U.S. Senate campaign of Tom Strickland in Colorado.

Daschle also currently serves on the advisory boards of EverFi and Phone 2 Action, as well as the faculty of Public Squared.

Awards
In October 2010, Daschle was recognized as one of Time magazine's "40 under 40" rising stars in politics.  He was also profiled in the September 2010 issue of Details magazine as one of the "16 game-changers in the worlds of entertainment, politics, fashion, and technology" in a piece titled "Mavericks."  In July 2006, Nathan was named as one of Washington's "40 Top Lawyers Under 40" by Washingtonian magazine.

Personal life
Despite being the son of prominent South Dakota politicians, Daschle has never lived nor resided in South Dakota. He has spent most of his life living in Washington DC.

References

External links
 Clear Channel Media & Entertainment
 Ruck.us
 EverFi
 Phone 2 Action
 The Public Squared

Living people
Harvard Law School alumni
Northwestern University alumni
American technology chief executives
Washington, D.C., Democrats
American Federation of State, County and Municipal Employees people
Year of birth missing (living people)